Anthony Charles McPhee (born 23 March 1944) is an English guitarist, and founder of the blues rock band Groundhogs. An early version of this band backed Champion Jack Dupree and John Lee Hooker on UK concerts in the mid-1960s. He is often credited as 'Tony (T.S.) McPhee'. He was given this name by the producer Mike Vernon who suggested adding 'T.S.' to his name when McPhee released a duet single with Champion Jack Dupree in 1966 called "Get Your Head Happy!," in order to make it look more like an official blues name. It stands for Tough Shit.

The Groundhogs evolved into a blues-rock trio that produced three UK Top 10 hits in the UK Albums Chart in the early 1970s. Although they have continued to play in various line-ups to the present day, McPhee officially retired from the band in 2015.

Solo album The Two Sides of Tony (T.S.) McPhee was released in 1973. Side A of this record is blues rock and Side B is a single psychedelic art rock electronic composition in four movements, featuring Arp 2600 Synthesizers, Electric Piano and The Rhythm Ace Drum Synthesizer.  Entitled The Hunt, it explores McPhee's strong stance against fox and stag hunting. McPhee has also released many other solo acoustic blues records, as well as duets with Jo Ann Kelly.

Apart from the Groundhogs, McPhee has played with Herbal Mixture, the John Dummer Band, Hapshash and the Coloured Coat, Tony McPhee's Terraplane, Tony McPhee's Turbo, the Tony McPhee Band and Current 93.

In 2009, McPhee suffered a stroke which affected his speech and ability to sing. See also 

McPhee's definitive biography, written by Paul Freestone was published in 2012.

Solo discography
 1966 Ain't Gonna Cry No More – Someone To Love Me
 1966 You Don't Love Me When You Gotta Good Friend
 1968 Me and the Devil - Various Artists
 1969 I Asked for Water - Various Artists
 1971 Same Thing on Their Minds
 1973 Two Sides of Tony McPhee
 1991 The Blues And The Beast
 1993 Foolish Pride
 1996 Slide, T.S., Slide
 1996 Herbal Mixture-Groundhogs
 1997 Bleachin' The Blues
 2000 Live In Poland At Blues Express
 2004 Blues At Ten

References

External links
Fanzine with audio, video and Tony McPhee and Groundhog games
Tony McPhee's official website

1944 births
Living people
People from the Borough of North East Lincolnshire
Blues rock musicians
English blues guitarists
English male guitarists
British rhythm and blues boom musicians
The Groundhogs members
English blues singers
John Dummer Band members